The National E (formerly Lazy E) is a two-person intermediate to senior sailing dinghy complete with main, jib, spinnaker and trapeze. It was designed by Jack Holt in 1962 as a fast stable boat. It encapsulates experience gained from his earlier designs of the GP14 and the Enterprise. It has a strong following in Australia with national titles held annually and over 560 sail numbers issued to date.

References

Dinghies
Sailing in Australia
Boats designed by Jack Holt